Night Moves is a role-playing game adventure published by TSR in 1990 for the Marvel Super Heroes role-playing game.

Contents
Night Moves is a scenario for the Advanced rules. The gang war gets out of hand as it moves into Chinatown, involving the Si Fan assassins and the Silver Samurai.

Publication history
MLA2 Night Moves was written by Anthony Herring, with a cover by Jeff Butler, and was published by TSR, Inc., in 1990 as a 64-page book, a large color map, and an outer folder.

Reception

Reviews

References

Marvel Comics role-playing game adventures
Role-playing game supplements introduced in 1990